Brian Hurwitz BA, MB BS, MA, MSc, MD, FRCP, FRCGP (born 12 December 1951) is a British clinician and academic and Professor of Medicine and the Arts at King's College London. He is the director of the Centre of the Humanities and Health at King's College London and is a medical General Practitioner.

He was educated at Ackworth School in Pontefract and Cheadle Hulme School in Cheshire, before taking a BA in History and Philosophy of Science at the University of Cambridge in 1974. He then graduated with an MBBS from University College, London in 1977, becoming a House Officer first at University College Hospital and then Northwick Park Hospital.

He became a General Practitioner (GP) in 1981 and a Registrar at Bloomsbury District Health Authority in 1982. He completed his GP specialisation training in 1985.

In 1995 he joined Imperial College London as senior lecturer in the Department of Primary Health, becoming head of department in 1999. He moved to King's College London as Professor of Medicine and the Arts in 2002.

Professor Hurwitz was awarded a Strategic Award by the Wellcome Trust in 2008 for a project, 'The Boundaries of Illness'. For the project, the Centre for the Humanities and Health was established at King's College London. By the end of 2010, the centre will have 7 post-doctoral researchers and 9 PhD students working on different aspects of the medical humanities.

References

External links
 Brian Hurwitz's page at King's College London
 The Centre for the Humanities and Health at King's College London

21st-century English medical doctors
Living people
1951 births
Academics of King's College London
People educated at Cheadle Hulme School